The 2018 Washington Huskies football team represented the University of Washington during the 2018 NCAA Division I FBS football season. Chris Petersen led the team in his fifth season as head coach. Washington competed as a member of the North Division of the Pac-12 Conference and played their home games on campus at Husky Stadium in Seattle.

The Huskies began the year ranked sixth in the preseason AP Poll and were the preseason favorites to win the Pac-12. In their first game of the year, Washington lost to then-No. 9 Auburn in the Chick-fil-A Kickoff Game played in Atlanta. The team rebounded and won the following five games before losing on the road to rival Oregon in overtime, and again two weeks later against California. With the Pac-12 North Division title on the line, Washington defeated in-state rival and seventh-ranked Washington State on the road in the 111th Apple Cup. The Huskies won their second Pac-12 title in three years by defeating Utah in the 2018 Pac-12 Football Championship Game. The team was invited to the Rose Bowl, where they were defeated by Ohio State to end the year at 10–4, 7–2 in conference play.

Washington was led offensively by senior quarterback Jake Browning, who threw for 3,192 yards and 16 touchdowns, and senior running back Myles Gaskin, who rushed for 1,268 yards and 12 touchdowns. Browning became the school's all-time passing leader on September 29 in the team's game against BYU, while Gaskin added to his all-time career rushing records that he set in 2017. The Husky defense was led by senior linebacker Ben Burr-Kirven, who led the Pac-12 in tackles and was named the Pac-12 Defensive Player of the Year. Burr-Kirven was named a first-team All-American by several selectors including the Associated Press.

Previous season
The Huskies finished the 2017 season 10–3, 7–2 in Pac-12 play to win a share of the North Division title with Stanford. Due to their head-to-head loss to Stanford, they did not represent the North Division in the Pac-12 Championship Game. They were invited to the Fiesta Bowl where they lost to Penn State.

Preseason

Recruiting
The Huskies signed a total of 20 recruits.

Transfers
The Huskies added 1 player and lost 7 players due to transfers.

Award watch lists
Listed in the order that they were released

Pac-12 Media Day
The 2018 Pac-12 media day took place on July 25, 2018, in Hollywood, California. Chris Petersen (HC), Jake Browning (QB) & Jojo McIntosh (DB) at Pac-12 Media Day. The Pac-12 media poll was released with the Huskies predicted to win the Pac-12 North division title and Pac-12 overall.

Schedule

Rankings

Personnel

Coaching staff

Roster

Game summaries

vs Auburn

North Dakota

at Utah

Arizona State

BYU

at UCLA

at Oregon

Colorado

at California

Stanford

Oregon State

at Washington State

Pac-12 Championship Game vs Utah

2019 Rose Bowl vs Ohio State

Awards and honors

Pac-12 Player of the Week

Reveal Suits National Team of the Week
Weekend of November 24

Dodd Trophy Coach of the Week

Pac-12 Pat Tillman Defensive Player of the Year: Ben Burr-Kirven

Postseason

NFL Scouting Combine

Nine members of the 2018 team were invited to participate in drills at the 2019 NFL Scouting Combine held between February 26 and March 4, 2019, at Lucas Oil Stadium in Indianapolis, Indiana.

 Top position performer

NFL Draft

The following Washington players were either selected or signed as undrafted free agents following the draft.

References

Washington
Washington Huskies football seasons
Pac-12 Conference football champion seasons
Washington Huskies football
Washington Huskies football